Traveller Supplement Adventure 8: Prison Planet is a 1982 role-playing game adventure for Traveller, written by Erik Wilson and Dave Emigh, and published by Game Designers' Workshop. This adventure focuses on the player characters' attempts to get out of prison.

Plot summary
Prison Planet includes 63 pages of maps, descriptions, rumor, prisoner, guard, and staff NPCs, events, and more.

Reception
William A. Barton reviewed Prison Planet in The Space Gamer No. 59. Barton commented that "Overall, Prison Planet is a different and complete enough adventure that all referees should be able to find it useful, even if only used in part."

Andy Slack reviewed Prison Planet for White Dwarf #39, giving it an overall rating of 5 out of 10, and stated that "The referee using this adventure will have to be a good storyteller to make most players enjoy the petty squalor of prison life, and will need to flesh out events and characters more than usual."

Reviews
 Different Worlds #32 (Jan./Feb., 1984)

References

Role-playing game supplements introduced in 1982
Traveller (role-playing game) adventures